Plaza Italia station is part of the line D of the Buenos Aires Underground. It is located at the intersection of Avenida Santa Fe and the roundabout surrounding Plaza Italia in Palermo. The station was opened on 23 February 1940 as part of the extension of Line D from Tribunales to Palermo.

A short distance  from the station are located the La Sociedad Rural Argentina (in English: The Argentine Rural Society), Buenos Aires Zoo and the Botanical Garden of Buenos Aires.

In 1997 the station was declared a national historic monument.

Gallery

Nearby
 Buenos Aires Zoo
 Buenos Aires Botanical Garden
 Monument to Giuseppe Garibaldi

See also
 La Rural

References

External links 

 Subterráneos de Buenos Aires (Official Page) Plaza Italia Underground Station

Buenos Aires Underground stations
Railway stations opened in 1938
1940 establishments in Argentina
National Historic Monuments of Argentina